Valonia (C. Agardh, 1823) is a genus of green algae in the Valoniaceae family.  The genus Ventricaria is now regarded as a synonym of Valonia.

Taxonomy and nomenclature 
The genus Valonia belongs to the order Cladophorales and class Valoiaceae. It comprises several taxonomically acceptable species based from available data and literatures.

Below is a list of common species of Valonia found throughout the tropics:

Valonia fastigiata Harvey ex J. Agardh 1823
Valonia ventricosa J.Agardh 1887
Valonia utricularis (Roth) Agardh 1823
Valonia aegagropila C. Agardh 1823
Valonia macrophysa Kützing 1843
Valonia ovalis C.Agardh 1822
Valonia chlorocladus Hauck 1886
Valonia cespitula Zanardini ex Kützing
Valonia pachynema (G. Martens) Børgesen
Valonia barbadensis W.R.Taylor, 1969
Valonia nutrix (Kraft & A.J.K.Millar) Kraft, 2007
Valonia oblongata J.Agardh, 1887
Valonia trabeculata Egerod, 1952

General morphological description

Thalli 
The succulent thallus of Valonia exhibits various shapes and form depending on species: vesicular or tubular cells forming either irregular cushions or hemispherical domes of intermediate sizes.  Thalli color can be green to dark green, olive-green, and brownish-green in some species.

Vesicles and rhizoid systems 
The vesicles can be subspherical, subclavate, elongate, or deformed. The branching of vesicles begins at the lenticular cells, which can be terminal and subdichotomous, or lateral and irregular. Seaweeds are attached to the substratum by short rhizoid system to basal rhizoidal cells.

Life history 

The life history of the genus Valonia is indistinguishable with the other Siphonocladales family members, particularly genus Boergesenia. Similar in several seaweeds, they exhibit a diplohaplontic life cycle, meaning an alternation between haploid (gametophytic) and diploid (sporophytic) free-living forms completes the cycle.

Specifically in Valonia, production of three-types of quadriflagellate zoospores (diploid) were observed and recorded in the species Valonia fastigiata and Valonia utricularis. These are mitozoospores (diploid) and meiozoospores (haploid) produced from the sporophytic phase, and mitozoospores (haploid) produced by the gametophytes. Eventually, meiozoospores will give rise to the gametophytes, while the mitozoospores produces the sporophytes thus completing the life cycle.

Distribution and ecology 

The genus Valonia is widely distributed throughout the tropical region, and some extends to the warm temperate areas.

Previous study have shown that the Mediterranean Sea ecotype - Valonia utricularis can extend its biogeographic distribution to warm temperate regions. This is attributed to the seaweed's chloroplast to function as a thermal acclimation organelle in response to exposure of varying temperature levels. It is achieved by controlling the number of pigments thereby decreasing light attainment while increasing the capacity for zeaxanthin-induced energy dissipation. However, ecotypes from the Indian Ocean display photoinhibition when exposed to colder temperatures.

In addition, Valonia ulticularis, along with other intertidal seaweeds (Gelidium corneum, Osmundea pinnatifida, and Caulacanthus ustulatus) where found to influence the vertical distribution of  peracarid crustaceans at the lower intertidal zones. Highest peak of peracarids were found to coincide with the highest seasonal growth of the associated macroalgae (around April–August). However, there are also some important ecological factors such as weather conditions, competitions, and predation which may also influence distribution patterns.

Economic Use/ Natural Products 
The genus Valonia, specifically Valonia aegagropila is utilized for human consumption as food. It contains numerous natural products/ secondary metabolites, such as, Pigments (carotene, chlorophyll a, chlorophyll b, lutein, siphonaxanthin, zeaxanthin, siphonein), Polysaccharide (starch), as well as Minerals (heavy metals).

Valonia ventricosa which compose similar natural products is often studied for the crystalline-structure of its cellulose to promote applications on accurate physical measurements.

The crystal-structure of Valonia cellulose Iβ was studied by Finkenstadt and Millane (1998). Using X-ray fiber diffraction analysis, it resolves the ambiguities in the cellulose structure that has been baffling for years. The crystalline structures were shown to be in parallel- up arrangements. The packing of the cellulose sheets of Valonia  is similar to the ramie cellulose (ramie fiber) found in other macroalgae and higher plant taxa. Application in fabric production can be explored due to the fact that ramie fiber is specifically used in that industry.

Production of levulinic acid from Valonia aegagropila and another Cladophorales, Chaetomorpha linum, were also explored and developed in recent years. Using an acid-catalyzed conversion, Valonia aegagropila were studied as a potential source for levulinic acid. The results were promising, achieving 16 wt% from V. aegagropila, calculated with respect to the initial dried biomass. This supports the potential use of the macroalgae as starting feedstocks for renewable biofuels that addresses natural resource and environmental issues.

Amino acids such as alanine, glutamine, methionine, proline, asparagine among others, as well as minerals such as calcium (Ca), magnesium (Mg), sodium (Na), potassium (K), and chlorine (Cl), were also found in Valonia, specifically Valonia fastigiata.

Furthermore, unsaturated fatty acids where shown to be high of concentration in Valonia aegagropila, together with other macroalgae (Agarophyton tenuistipitatum, and brown seaweeds (Pheaophyta). Unsaturated fatty acids are healthy fats that can be utilized for medicinal applications, e.g. improving cholesterol levels, reduce inflammations, and stabilize heart rhythms among others.

References

See the NCBI webpage on Valonia.  Data extracted from the

External links

Cladophorales
Cladophorales genera